John Sylvester Joseph Maher (10 July 1916 – 26 August 1993) was a former Australian rules footballer who played with Melbourne in the Victorian Football League (VFL).

Notes

External links 

 Jack Maher: demonwiki.

1916 births
Australian rules footballers from Victoria (Australia)
Melbourne Football Club players
Old Xaverians Football Club players
Australian military personnel of World War II
1993 deaths